Rachel Moloney born 1982 in Cork is a camogie player and a teacher, winner of five All Ireland camogie medals in 2002, 2005, 2006, 2008, and 2009  and three camogie All Star awards in 2005, 2008 and 2009. She holds two Ashbourne Cup medals with U.C.C. as well as Minor, Junior, Intermediate and Senior All-Ireland championship honours with Cork. Has won inter-provincial honours with Munster and is the side's free-taker and top scorer. Rachel is coach to her club's Under-14 team.

References

External links 
 Official Camogie Website
 Cronin’s championship diary in On The Ball Official Camogie Magazine
 https://web.archive.org/web/20091228032101/http://www.rte.ie/sport/gaa/championship/gaa_fixtures_camogie_oduffycup.html Fixtures and results] for the 2009 O'Duffy Cup
 All-Ireland Senior Camogie Championship: Roll of Honour
 Video highlights of 2009 championship Part One and part two
 Video Highlights of 2009 All Ireland Senior Final
 Report of All Ireland final in Irish Times Independent and Examiner

1982 births
Living people
Cork camogie players
UCC camogie players